Mgr. Clément BONNAND (20 May 1796 – 21 March 1861) was a missionary of Paris Foreign Missions Society and was the Vicar Apostolic of Pondicherry from 3 April 1850 until his death on 21 March 1861.

He was born on 20 May 1796 in Saint-Maurice-sur-Dargoire, France, he was ordained priest on 17 June 1821. He served for some time as an assistant in a parish of his own diocese. He joined the MEP Seminary on 14 November 1823. He left for the Malabar Mission on 4 February 1824 and served first at Phirangipuram in Andhra Pradesh.

Consecration

He was selected as Coadjutor by Bishop Louis-Charles-Auguste Hébert in 1831. He hesitated a long time before accepting this charge.
He was consecrated on 8 November 1833 at Oulgaret in Our Lady of Victory Church. This odd place was chosen for his consecration because the diocese was hit by a heavy famine and it was feared that a lavish ceremony would result in the hatred of the starving people. Mgr. Hébert also advised not to inform about the consecration even to the priests of the vicarate. Anyhow, Mgr. Bonnand informed Fr. Surpiés. The ceremony was considered as a mean one by Bonnand himself, because he was given an old white mitre and Mgr. Hébert's cassock was adjusted to fit him.
 The Annals of the Propagation of the Faith mentions that Dr. Bonnand was authorized by the Holy See to send missionaries to the Maldive Islands where the Christian faith has not reached.

Mission Press
Mgr. Bonnand encouraged his priests to enter into the press media. The catholic mission started their own schools and began to publish books on matter of Catholic Doctrine. Mgr. Bonnand himself published a small catechism book in 1837. Due to the usefulness this media, a new printing press was established by the mission near the cathedral in 1841. In this press, Mgr. Bonnand published a larger catechism book in 1841.

The Synod of Pondicherry
The Salient point of his tenure as Vicar Apostolic, was "The Synod of Pondicherry". It took place from 18 January to 13 February 1844. It was to have a very great influence not only in India but in all the Far East. After the Synod, Father LUQUET was sent to Rome to plead for the creation of local catholic hierarchy in India, but the request was too much ahead of the time.

On 16 March 1845 the Vicariate Apostolic of Pondicherry was divided into three missions. Namely: Pondicherry, Coimbatore and Mysore. On 3 April 1850, by the Brief "Pastorale Minsisterium" Mysore and Coimbatore too, were elevated into an Apostolic Vicariate.

In 1849, Mgr Bonnad held a second synod that completed the work of the Synod of 1844.

On 13 August 1859 Mgr Bonnand was appointed by Pope Pius IX, Visitor Apostolic for all the missions in India. He left Pondicherry, never to return, on 29 November 1859. He died in Benares on 21 March 1861.

The short biography of his predecessor Mgr. Hébert, ends with the following note:" Selecting Mgr BONNAND as his successor may be considered as the greatest service he rendered to the mission." Mgr. Bonnand, was one of the most remarkable Vicar Apostolic of the MEP Society and the missions in India where he played an important role for more than 20 years.

References

 
 

 
 

1796 births
1861 deaths
Roman Catholic archbishops of Pondicherry and Cuddalore
19th-century Roman Catholic archbishops in India
French Roman Catholic missionaries
Paris Foreign Missions Society missionaries
French Roman Catholic bishops in Asia
Roman Catholic missionaries in India
French expatriates in India